Jeffrey Schaub is a news anchor and reporter for KCBS-AM/KCBS-FM in San Francisco, CA. He worked as a reporter and news anchor at KPIX-TV for 20 years (1990–2010) and then worked for two years at KGO-810 News Radio. While at KPIX-TV, he specialized in stories about education, transportation, and the environment. Schaub previously served as Vice President for operations at traffic central, a broadcast service for radio and tv stations in several western cities. Prior to that, he worked in tv and radio in Aspen, Colorado and at KTIM radio in San Rafael, California.

Achievements

During his career, Schaub has earned three Emmy awards, one shared Peabody award, and multiple awards from the Radio-Television News Directors Association. His news reporting has covered the 1989 Loma Prieta earthquake and the 1991 Oakland Hills firestorm, the Asiana plane crash at San Francisco International Airport, the October 2017 North Bay and Santa Rosa fires and many other major news events. Schaub's coverage of political events has spanned six national party conventions, the 2000 election crisis, the presidential inauguration of George W. Bush, and the state funeral for President Reagan.

Public Speaking and Master of Ceremonies

Schaub served as the master of ceremonies for Cleantech Open's 2009 gala and awards ceremony. He also served as a public speaker at Sonoma State University's 2001 Lincoln Steffens Awards Dinner.

Education

Schaub graduated from Morristown-Beard School, a private preparatory school in Morristown, NJ, in 1977. He received his bachelor's degree in broadcast communications from Emerson College in Boston, MA in 1981. While at Emerson, Schaub founded The Independent, the school newspaper, and he reported news at WERS-FM, one of the school's two radio stations.

References

American male journalists
American broadcasters
Living people
Morristown-Beard School alumni
Emerson College alumni
Year of birth missing (living people)